Krasne Pole may refer to:

 Krasne Pole, Głubczyce County, a village in Poland
 Krasne Pole, Markivka Raion, a village in Markivka Raion, Ukraine